Jeffery L. Jackson (born June 22, 1955) is an American ice hockey coach and currently is head coach at the University of Notre Dame. Previously, he was the head coach at Lake Superior State University, where he won two NCAA championships in ice hockey.  He has also been an assistant coach with the New York Islanders and head coach for the Guelph Storm.

Coaching career
Jackson got his start in college hockey at Lake Superior State University in 1986, where he worked with Frank Anzalone, helping lead the Lakers to one CCHA championship, and the 1988 NCAA Men's Ice Hockey Championship.  When Anzalone left the Lakers in 1990, Jackson was promoted to head coach.

In his six years as head coach with Lake Superior, from 1990 to 1996, Jackson led the team to six consecutive NCAA appearances, including three straight trips to the finals from 1992 to 1994, and winning the 1992 and 1994 championships.

Jackson stepped down as head coach of Lake Superior to become the national coach and senior director of the newly founded U.S. National Team Development program, based in Ann Arbor, Michigan.  In his first season, he guided the U.S. Junior National Team to a silver medal in the 1997 World Junior Championships.  Jackson was also an assistant coach for Team USA at the 1998 Winter Olympics.

He left the U.S. National Team in 2000 to become the head coach of the Guelph Storm in the Ontario Hockey League.  Jackson led the Storm to a 16-point improvement from the previous season, as Guelph finished in second place in the Midwest Division.  In the 2001–02 season, Guelph improved once again, as they earned 82 points, finishing in second place once again in the Midwest Division, and hosted the 2002 Memorial Cup, advancing to the tie-breaker game, where they lost to the Victoriaville Tigres.  Jackson began the 2002–03 with the Storm, however, the team struggled and Jackson was replaced midway through the season.  He had a record of 87–67–24–4 during his time in Guelph.

Jackson moved on to the New York Islanders of the National Hockey League in 2003–04, as he was hired by Islanders head coach Steve Stirling to work on his staff.  The Islanders had a successful season, earning 91 points and a trip to the playoffs, however, they were eliminated by the Tampa Bay Lightning in the first round.  Jackson remained with the club during the cancelled 2004–05 NHL season.

In 2005, the Notre Dame Fighting Irish hired Jackson to turn around their hockey team, which had a tough 2004–05 season, in which the Irish had a record of 5–27–6.  In his first year in Notre Dame, Jackson helped the team to a 13–19–4 record, which was a fourteen-point improvement over the previous season.  In 2006–07, the Fighting Irish set numerous team records, including overall wins (32) and CCHA wins (21) as Notre Dame captured their first ever CCHA regular season and tournament championships.  The Irish advanced to the NCAA tournament for the second time in school history, and earned their first ever tournament win.  Jackson was awarded the CCHA Coach of the Year and the Spencer Penrose Award as the National Coach of the Year.  Notre Dame had another strong season in 2007–08, and advanced to the NCAA Championship for the second straight season.  The Fighting Irish upset the #1 seed University of New Hampshire 7–3 in their first game, followed by a 3–1 victory over Michigan State to advance to the Frozen Four for the first time in school history.  Notre Dame stayed hot, and defeated the #1 seeded Michigan Wolverines 5–4 in overtime to advance to their first ever berth in the final.  Boston College would win the championship, as they defeated Notre Dame 4–1. Another record-setting regular season followed in 2008–09, with the Irish earning a top seed in the NCAA Championship, however they were defeated in the first round by Bemidji State.

Head coaching record

College

See also
List of college men's ice hockey coaches with 400 wins

External links

Notre Dame bio

1955 births
Living people
American ice hockey coaches
Guelph Storm coaches
Ice hockey coaches from Michigan
Lake Superior State Lakers men's ice hockey coaches
Michigan State University alumni
New York Islanders coaches
Notre Dame Fighting Irish ice hockey coaches
People from Roseville, Michigan
Sportspeople from Metro Detroit